Villanova University